Hoke Hayden Warner (May 22, 1894 – February 19, 1947) was a baseball player for the Chicago Cubs and the Pittsburgh Pirates. He was 170 pounds and batted left and threw right. He started his career on August 21, 1916. His final game was on June 17, 1921. He was born on May 22, 1894, in Del Rio, Texas. He died on February 19, 1947, in San Francisco, California.

References
Baseball-Reference

People from Del Rio, Texas
Pittsburgh Pirates players
Chicago Cubs players
1894 births
1947 deaths
Jackson Convicts players
Jackson Chiefs players
Dayton Veterans players
Kansas City Blues (baseball) players
Major League Baseball third basemen
Baseball players from Texas